Silometopus elegans is a species of spiders in the family Linyphiidae found in Europe. It was first described by Octavius Pickard-Cambridge in 1873, as Erigone elegans. It was transferred to the genus Silometopus by Eugène Simon in 1884.

See also 
 List of Linyphiidae species
 Biota of the Isle of Man
 List of arachnids of Ireland

References 

Linyphiidae
Spiders described in 1873
Spiders of Europe